Sugar Run is a stream in the U.S. state of Ohio. It is a tributary to Todd Fork.

Sugar Run most likely was named for the sugar maple timber along its course. A variant name was "Sugar Creek".

References

Rivers of Warren County, Ohio
Rivers of Ohio